Cinqueux is a commune in the Oise department in northern France. The residents of Cinqueux are called Cinquatiens and Cinquatiennes. Cinqueux has a population of 1 541 , an estimate from the National Institute of Statistics ad Economic Studies Insee.

Geography 

Government and politics

The town is located in the arrondissement of Clermont of the department of Oise since 1942. It his part of the 7th constituency of Oise since 1988.
From 1793 to 2014, it was part of the canton of Liancourt, except from October 15, 1801 to February 22, 1802, during which it was attached to the canton of Mouy. After the cantonal redistribution in 2014, the town is now attached to the canton of Pont-Sainte-Maxence.

Intercommunality
Cinqueux is part of the communauté de communes des pays d'Oise et d'Halatte created in January 1998.

Mayors

See also
Communes of the Oise department

References

Communes of Oise